Almat Kabdrashevich Kebispayev (born 12 December 1987) is a Greco-Roman wrestler from Kazakhstan who competes in the 67 kg weight division. He won five medals at the world championships in 2010–2021 and competed at the 2012 and 2016 Olympics.

In 2021, he won one of the bronze medals in the 67 kg event at the Matteo Pellicone Ranking Series 2021 held in Rome, Italy.

References

External links
 

1987 births
Living people
People from Urzhar District
Wrestlers at the 2012 Summer Olympics
Wrestlers at the 2016 Summer Olympics
Olympic wrestlers of Kazakhstan
Wrestlers at the 2014 Asian Games
Wrestlers at the 2018 Asian Games
Asian Games medalists in wrestling
World Wrestling Championships medalists
Kazakhstani male sport wrestlers
Asian Games silver medalists for Kazakhstan
Asian Games bronze medalists for Kazakhstan
Universiade medalists in wrestling
Medalists at the 2014 Asian Games
Medalists at the 2018 Asian Games
Universiade bronze medalists for Kazakhstan
Medalists at the 2013 Summer Universiade
Asian Wrestling Championships medalists
21st-century Kazakhstani people